Bernard Jules Brillstein (April 26, 1931 – August 7, 2008) was an American film and television producer, executive producer, and talent agent.

He began his career in the 1950s at the William Morris Agency before founding his own company in 1969 and later joining forces with Brad Grey to helm Brillstein-Grey Entertainment (now Brillstein Entertainment Partners), one of the most important and influential Hollywood talent management and production companies. He is remembered for producing successful TV programs like Hee Haw, The Muppet Show, and The Sopranos, and hit films including The Blues Brothers, Ghostbusters and Happy Gilmore.

Early life
Bernie Brillstein was born to a Jewish family in Manhattan, to Moe Brillstein and Matilda "Tillie" Brillstein (née Perlman), who all shared the Manhattan home of his uncle, the vaudeville and radio performer Jack Pearl. Brillstein's father, a milliner, was the guiding force behind the building of the Millinery Center Synagogue, a synagogue located in the Garment District in Manhattan.

Career
Brillstein earned his way into show business in the mailroom at the William Morris Agency (WMA) in New York. He worked his way up to talent agent and by the 1960s, he was a manager-producer of television programming for the company. Still associated with WMA, he joined Management III in 1964 to continue talent management. In the 1960s, he also co-founded the vocal group The Doodletown Pipers.

The Brillstein Company
By now living in Los Angeles, Brillstein formed The Brillstein Company in 1969. There, he continued to manage stars and develop television programming. He produced such popular television hits as Hee Haw, The Muppet Show and Saturday Night Live.

Brillstein later became manager of SNL alumni Dan Aykroyd, Gilda Radner, John Belushi, Martin Short, and executive producer Lorne Michaels, as well as Jim Henson (of Muppets fame) and Paul Fusco (voice and operator of ALF). He produced such other television shows as ALF: The Animated Series, and Normal Life. He was also exclusive producer to the animation sequel The Real Ghostbusters (based on the hit movie).

Brillstein-Grey Entertainment
In the 1980s, he met Brad Grey at a television convention in San Francisco. In 1991, the two formed a production company, Brillstein-Grey Entertainment, which packages programming and manages talent. They were responsible for such shows as NewsRadio, Just Shoot Me!, The Larry Sanders Show and The Sopranos. As executive producer, Brillstein was responsible for such successes as The Blues Brothers, Ghostbusters, Dragnet, Ghostbusters II, Happy Gilmore and The Cable Guy. Brillstein sold his shares in the company to Grey, his one time protégé, in 1996. Grey sold his interest in the company in 2005. He also represented Nick Swardson for six years prior to his death.

Brillstein's 1999 memoir, Where Did I Go Right?: You're No One in Hollywood Unless Someone Wants You Dead, was co-written with David Rensin. Two years later, he received the honor as recipient of a star on Hollywood Walk of Fame, on April 18, 2001. His second book The Little Stuff Matters Most, a humorous advice collection, was published in 2004.

Personal life
In 1967, Brillstein married Laura Smith. In 1975, he married Deborah Ellen Koskoff. In 1998, Brillstein married Carrie Winston Brillstein, a marriage that lasted until his 2008 death.

On the evening of August 7, 2008, around 9:00 pm, Brillstein died of chronic obstructive pulmonary disease at a Los Angeles hospital.

Filmography
He was a producer in all films unless otherwise noted.

Film

Thanks

Television

Miscellaneous crew

As an actor

Thanks

Publications
 Bernie Brillstein with David Rensin (1999). Where Did I Go Right?: You're No One in Hollywood Unless Someone Wants You Dead!. Little Brown Inc.  (Chapter One online)
 The Little Stuff Matters Most (2004). Bernie Brillstein with David Rensin

References

External links

 
 
 Obituary and memories – Nikki Finke
 The Man Who Loved Show Business by David Rensin.
 

Film producers from New York (state)
20th-century American Jews
Television producers from New York City
Stuyvesant High School alumni
1931 births
2008 deaths
New York University alumni
Deaths from pulmonary embolism
Burials at Hillside Memorial Park Cemetery
21st-century American Jews